Miroslav Úradník (born 24 March 1996) is a Slovakian racewalking athlete. He represented Slovakia at the 2020 Summer Olympics in the men's 20 kilometres walk.

Career
Úradník represented Slovakia at the 2020 Summer Olympics in the men's 20 kilometres walk and finished in 41st place.

Competition record

References

1996 births
Living people
Slovak male racewalkers
Athletes (track and field) at the 2020 Summer Olympics
Olympic athletes of Slovakia